Two-stage presidential elections were held in Finland in January 1982. The public elected presidential electors to an electoral college on 17 and 18 January. They in turn elected the President. The result was a victory for Mauno Koivisto, the first member of the Social Democratic Party to be elevated to the country's highest post, and his election meant the full integration of Social Democrats into Finnish public life and an end to the postwar dominance of the Centre Party.

Background
Koivisto had been a leading public figure since the late 1960s, when he had served as Prime Minister for two years. During the 1970s, as governor of the Bank of Finland and, for a short time, as Minister of Finance, he had won the public's respect for the accuracy of his economic forecasts. His personality and considerable media astuteness also won him a very considerable personal popularity across party lines. Born in 1923 in Turku, the son of a carpenter, he fought bravely during World War II. After the war he returned to his native city, and through years of part-time study, earned a doctorate in sociology in 1956. He was active within the moderate wing of the SDP, yet did not seek an elective office. He began his banking career by directing a large employees' savings bank in Helsinki.

Summoned again in 1979 to serve as Prime Minister, Koivisto retained the public's esteem and became a strong potential candidate for the presidential election scheduled for 1984. Seen by Centre Party politicians as a threat to their party's hold on the presidency after Urho Kekkonen's inevitable retirement, Koivisto was pressured to resign in the spring of 1981. He refused, telling Kekkonen that he would continue as Prime Minister until a lack of parliamentary support for his government was shown. Koivisto's survival despite Kekkonen's challenge was seen by some observers as the end of an era in which the president had dominated Finnish public life.

In autumn 1981 failing health forced Kekkonen to resign the presidency, and Koivisto assumed the duties of the office until the presidential election set for January 1982, two years ahead of schedule. He won handily, with the Social Democratic Party receiving 43% of the votes with a turnout of 81.3% --and 145 of the electors. With the support of some electors pledged to the Finnish People's Democratic League candidate, he won, with 167 votes, on the first ballot of the electoral college. His popularity remained high during his first term, and he easily won re-election in 1988.

Results

Popular vote

Electoral college

References

1982
1982 elections in Finland
January 1982 events in Europe